The Promé Divishon (Papiamento: "First division") also known as Liga MCB 1st Division for sponsorship reasons, is the top association football league and only semi-professional league in Curaçao, constituent country of the Netherlands. Up to 2010 the top two teams in this competition got to compete in the Kopa Antiano, the Netherlands Antilles Championship. After the dissolution of the country, Curaçao became the successor of the Netherlands Antilles in CONCACAF and the teams competing can qualify for the CONCACAF Champions League, by placing in the top final three positions of the CFU Club Championship. The teams who finish at the bottom of the league table, have to compete with the top two teams of the Curaçao Segundo Divishon, the 2nd tier of football in Curaçao for placement in Promé Divishon the following season.

Promé Divishon - 2020–21 teams

Centro Dominguito (Dominguito, Willemstad)
CSD Barber (Barber)
Inter Willemstad (Willemstad)
Jong Holland (Willemstad)
Scherpenheuvel (Skerpene, Willemstad)
SUBT (Willemstad)
UNDEBA (Banda'bou)
VESTA (Willemstad)
Victory Boys (Noord Zapateer, Willemstad)
Sithoc (Willemstad)

History
The league was created back in 1921. For the 1974–75 season it was renamed to Sekshon Pagá and changed to an autumn/spring season cycle. From 1959 up to 2009–10 the champion played a final for the Netherlands Antilles Championship, in which mostly the Curaçao champion won.

Previous winners
Previous winners are:

1921 : CVV Sparta
1921–22 : MVC Juliana
1922–23 : CVV Sparta
1924–25 : CVV Sparta
1925–26 : CRKSV Jong Holland
1926–27 : Dutch Football Club
1928 : CRKSV Jong Holland
1929 : SOV Asiento
1930 : SOV Asiento
1931 : CVV Volharding
1932 : CRKSV Jong Holland
1933 : VV Transvaal
1934–35 : SOV Asiento
1935–36 : CRKSV Jong Holland
1936–37 : SV Racing Club Curaçao
1937–38 : CRKSV Jong Holland
1938–39 : SV SUBT
1939–40 : CRKSV Jong Holland
1940–42 : SV SUBT
1942–43 : Sportclub Independiente
1943–44 : CRKSV Jong Holland
1944–46 : SV SUBT
1946–47 : SV SUBT
1947–48 : SV SUBT
1948–49 : not held
1949–50 : CRKSV Jong Holland
1950 : SV SUBT
1951 : SV SUBT
1952 : CRKSV Jong Holland
1953–54 : SV SUBT
1954–55 : SV SUBT
1955–56 : SV SUBT
1956 : SV SUBT
1957 : not held
1958–59 : SV SUBT
1959–60 : CRKSV Jong Holland
1960–61 : RKVFC Sithoc (Mahuma)
1961–62 : RKVFC Sithoc (Mahuma)
1962–63 : FC Veendam
1963–64 : CRKSV Jong Colombia (Boca Samí)
1964–65 : RKSV Scherpenheuvel
1965–66 : CRKSV Jong Colombia (Boca Samí)
1966–67 : CRKSV Jong Colombia (Boca Samí)
1967–68 : CRKSV Jong Colombia (Boca Samí)
1968–69 : RKSV Scherpenheuvel
1969–70 : CRKSV Jong Colombia (Boca Samí)
1970–71 : not held
1971–72 : SV SUBT
1973 : CRKSV Jong Colombia (Boca Samí)

Sekshon Pagá

1974–75 : CRKSV Jong Colombia (Boca Samí)
1975–76 : SV SUBT
1976–77 : CRKSV Jong Holland
1977–78 : SV SUBT
1978–79 : CRKSV Jong Colombia (Boca Samí)
1979–80 : SV SUBT
1980 : SV SUBT
1981 : CRKSV Jong Holland
1982 : SV SUBT
1983 : SV SUBT
1984 : SV SUBT
1985 : SV SUBT
1986 : RKVFC Sithoc (Mahuma)
1987 : RKSVC Dominguito
1988 : CRKSV Jong Colombia (Boca Samí)
1989 : RKVFC Sithoc (Mahuma)
1990–91 : RKVFC Sithoc (Mahuma)
1991 : RKVFC Sithoc (Mahuma)
1992 : RKVFC Sithoc (Mahuma)
1993 : RKVFC Sithoc (Mahuma)
1994 : CRKSV Jong Colombia (Boca Samí)
1995–96 : RKVFC Sithoc (Mahuma)
1996 : UNDEBA
1997 : UNDEBA
1998–99 : CRKSV Jong Holland
2000 : CRKSV Jong Colombia (Boca Samí)
2001–02 : CSD Barber
2002–03 : CSD Barber
2003–04 : CSD Barber
2004–05 : CSD Barber
2005–06 : UNDEBA
2006–07 : CSD Barber
2007–08 : UNDEBA
2009 : SV Hubentut Fortuna
2009–10 : SV Hubentut Fortuna
2010–11 : SV Hubentut Fortuna
2012 : RKSV Centro Dominguito
2013 : RKSV Centro Dominguito
2014 : CSD Barber
2015: RKSV Centro Dominguito

Promé Divishon

2016: RKSV Centro Dominguito
2017: RKSV Centro Dominguito
2017–18: CRKSV Jong Holland
2018–19: S.V. Vesta
2019–20:  RKSV Scherpenheuvel

2020-21 Jong Holland

Performance by club

References

External links
fifa.com; League overview, standings, fixtures

 
Football competitions in Curaçao
Football competitions in the Netherlands Antilles
Sports leagues established in 1921
1921 establishments in Curaçao and Dependencies